The World Allround Speed Skating Championships for Men took place on 21 and 22 March 1992 in Calgary at the Olympic Oval ice rink.

Title holder was the Norwegian Johann Olav Koss.

Classification

 * = Fell
  DNS = Did not start

Source:

References

World Allround Speed Skating Championships, 1992
1992 World Allround

Attribution
In Dutch